.art is a generic top-level domain (gTLD) in the Domain Name System of the Internet.

History 
The  TLD was entered into a registry agreement on March 24, 2016, between ICANN and UK Creative Ideas Limited, and it became available to the public on 10 May 2017.
There were nine other competing bids to operate the top-level domain.
 
Domains were registered by tech companies, luxury brands, and cultural organizations; some early registrations were purchased by Apple, Instagram, Kickstarter, and Rolex, along with the Louvre, Tate, the Centre Pompidou, the Art Institute of Chicago, and the Guggenheim.
.art domain names can be assigned directly to artworks (rather than to institutions or individuals). This new service is called «Digital Twin».   By negotiating a unique agreement with ICANN .art has integrated into its domain registration forms the option of adding specific description fields. These fields contain information based on the Object ID – a universal art object identification standard developed by J. Paul Getty Trust and adopted by UNESCO, ICOM, and major law enforcement agencies. The standard contains necessary information about an artwork and its owner. 
 
In 2020, the .art registry received a United States patent for storing and identifying objects in WHOIS. The service is known as Digital Twin.

References

External links
 Registrar portal website

 
Generic top-level domains
Art websites
Computer-related introductions in 2017